Fauna of Hungary may refer to:

 List of birds of Hungary
 List of mammals of Hungary

See also
 Outline of Hungary